Tintagel Colombo is a boutique hotel in Colombo, Sri Lanka and the former town residence of the Bandaranaike family. The hotel is situated in Rosmead Place in Cinnamon Gardens.

History
Homi Billimoria designed the Tintagel Colombo in 1929 for gynecologist Dr. Lucian de Zilwa. During World War II, Dr. de Zilwa was asked to vacate the house within seven days by the British military in order to house hundreds of soldiers. Having seen the military occupation has damaged the house, Dr. de Zilwa sold the house to Sir Solomon Dias Bandaranaike for Rs. 160,000. Later Sir Solomon's son, S. W. R. D. Bandaranaike occupied the house. S. W. R. D. became the prime minister in 1956 and was shot on the verandah of the house in 1959. His widow, Sirimavo Bandaranaike became the first female prime minister of the world in 1960. She continued to live in the house during her two other ministries, in 1970 and in 1994, up until her death in 2000.

Boutique hotel
Shanth Fernando of Paradise Road Hotels took over the house in 2005 and converted it to a boutique hotel. Charles, Prince of Wales and Camilla, Duchess of Cornwall stayed at the hotel during their Sri Lankan visit in 2013. The hotel consists of 10 suites and two restaurants, the Courtyard and the Red Bar. The library of the house contains 6,000 books including 5,000 leather-bound volumes.

See also
List of hotels in Sri Lanka

References

External links
 Official website

1929 establishments in Ceylon
Hotels in Colombo
Houses in Colombo
Hotels established in 2005